The men's 400 metre individual medley (IM) at the 2007 World Aquatics Championships took place on 1 April (heats and final) at the Rod Laver Arena in Melbourne, Australia. As the event was over 400 meters in length, no semifinals were held in it and the top 8 swimmers from the preliminary heats advance directly to the single final heat. 50 swimmers were entered in the event, of which 49 swam.

Existing records at the start of the event were:
World record (WR):  4:08.26, Michael Phelps (USA), August 17, 2004 in Athens, Greece
Championship record (CR): 4:09.09, Michael Phelps (USA), Barcelona, Spain (July 27, 2003)

Results

Finals

Heats

See also
Swimming at the 2005 World Aquatics Championships – Men's 400 metre individual medley
Swimming at the 2008 Summer Olympics – Men's 400 metre individual medley
Swimming at the 2009 World Aquatics Championships – Men's 400 metre individual medley

References

Men's 400m IM Heats results from the 2007 World Championships. Published by OmegaTiming.com (official timer of the '07 Worlds); retrieved 2009-07-11.
Men's 400m IM Final results from the 2007 World Championships. Published by OmegaTiming.com (official timer of the '07 Worlds); retrieved 2009-07-11.

Swimming at the 2007 World Aquatics Championships